Clicquot may refer to:
Firms
 Veuve Clicquot, French champagne house
 Clicquot Club, nightclub in Atlantic City, New Jersey
 Clicquot Club Company, American soda company
People
 Madame Clicquot (1777–1866) eponymous owner of Veuve Clicquot champagne house
 Robert Clicquot (1645–1719) French organ builder
 François-Henri Clicquot (1732–90) French organ builder
 Claude-François Clicquot (1762–1801) French organ builder
Places
 Millis-Clicquot, Massachusetts, census-designated place in Millis, Norfolk County